The Ror is a caste found mainly in northern India.

Ror, ROR or RoR  may also refer to:

People 
 Dalel Singh Ror, Indian volleyball player 
 Ror Wolf (born 1932), German writer and artist

Places 
 ROR, the IATA code for Palau International Airport
 Ror River, tributary of the Târnava Mică River in Romania

Business 
 Rate of return, profit on an investment over a period of time
 Ripoff Report, a consumer advocacy website
 Run of River Power, a Canadian hydro power company

Organizations 
 Reach Out and Read, an American non-profit organization
 Reaching Out Romania, a Romanian non-governmental charitable organization
 Regiment Oranjerivier, an armoured regiment of the South African Army
 Research-on-Research Committee, a nonprofit association
 Research Organization Registry, a database of research organizations
 Retraining of Racehorses, an animal welfare organization in the United Kingdom
 Rhythms of Resistance, a network of political percussion bands

Science and technology

Biology and chemistry 
 R-O-R, general formula for ethers, a class of organic compounds
 ROR, abbreviation for RAR-related orphan receptor, a family of nuclear receptors in molecular biology
 ROR, abbreviation for receptor tyrosine kinase-like orphan receptors, a family of cell surface receptors
 ROR, abbreviation for risk of recurrence

Computing 
 Resources of a Resource, an XML format for describing common website objects to search engines
 Rigs of Rods, a multi-simulation game which uses soft-body physics
 ROtate Right, a common circular shift instruction in assembly language
 Ruby on Rails, a server side Web application framework

Other uses
 Review of Religions, a comparative religious magazine in print since 1902
 RoR, common police shorthand for Released on own Recognizance
 RoR, a common abbreviation for Record of Ragnarok
 Rule of Rose, a 2006 Japanese video game
 Run-of-the-river hydroelectricity

See also 
 RooR, a German glass bong company